Muriša is a novel by Slovenian author Feri Lainšček. It was first published in 2006.

See also
List of Slovenian novels

Slovenian novels
2006 novels